José Domingo Insfrán (born 4 August 1949) is a Paraguayan footballer. He played in eight matches for the Paraguay national football team from 1975 to 1977. He was also part of Paraguay's squad for the 1975 Copa América tournament.

References

External links
 

1949 births
Living people
Paraguayan footballers
Paraguay international footballers
Place of birth missing (living people)
Association footballers not categorized by position